Enrico Forlanini (13 December 1848 – 9 October 1930) was an Italian engineer, inventor and aeronautical pioneer, known for his works on helicopters, aeroplanes, hydrofoils and dirigibles. He was born in Milan. His older brother Carlo Forlanini was a  physician.

Early life

Enrico Forlanini was born to Francesco Forlanini, a notable physician and director of the Ospedale Fatebenefratelli in Milan. After elementary school he attended one of the three Milan Regie Scuole Tecniche, in 1863 he entered the Military College of Turin.

In 1866 he enrolled at the Military Academy of Turin, and become a Lieutenant of Engineers. Enrico enrolled in the Scuola di Applicazione Artiglieria e Genio (Application School of Artillery and Engineers) in Turin in 1868.

Upon graduation in 1870, Forlanini was assigned to Casale Monferrato, where he was able to work in the police station's workshop. He began working on a systematic testing of propellers. 
He subsequently studied at Politecnico di Milano and graduated in Industrial Engineering.

Helicopter model
In 1877, he developed an early helicopter powered by a steam engine. It was the first of
its type that rose to a height of 13 meters, where it remained for some 20 seconds, after a vertical take-off from a park in Milan.

Industry

Then, he worked in Forlì, in a society named Società Anonima Forlivese per l’illuminazione a gas e per la fonderia di ferro.

Airships

Later he designed and built a series of dirigibles, notably, designed in 1901 and launched in 1909, the Leonardo da Vinci that he dedicated to the famous Renaissance inventor and, in 1912, the Città di Milano, dedicated to his beloved home town. The latter showed exceptionally good characteristics of stability and controllability that won Forlanini international renown. A further four airships were constructed: F3, F4, F5 and F6. A seventh, named Omnia Dir was only completed after his death.

Hydrofoils

He is also known for his hydrofoils that he started modelling since 1898. One of those, built at full scale, used a ladder system of foils and a  engine driving two counter-rotating air props.
During testing on Lake Maggiore in 1906, this craft reached a top speed of 68 km/h (42.5 mph).

Legacy
Forlanini obtained a number of British and American patents on his ideas and designs, most of which were aimed at seaplane applications.

He died in 1930 while still working on the design of the Omnia Dir airship.

Milan has dedicated to him its city airport, also named Linate Airport, as well as the nearby park, the Parco Forlanini. He also has an avenue named after him.

Notes

References

Diego Brozzola. 1999. Aerei Italiani - "Il mio Idroplano" dell'Ing Enrico Forlanini (Italian) last accessed 2008-06-30
Gian Luca Lapini. 2004. Storia di Milano ::: Enrico Forlanini (Italian) last accessed 2008-06-30
OFFICINE LEONARDO DA VINCI THE HISTORY - Enrico Formanini and the Officine Leonardo da Vinci
The New York Times Magazine. 1918-01-13 Page SM3. New Italian Airship Better Than Zeppelin, last accessed 2008-06-30 (full article)

1848 births
1930 deaths
Engineers  from Milan
19th-century Italian inventors
Italian aerospace engineers
Airship designers
Polytechnic University of Milan alumni
20th-century Italian inventors